The Canton of Carvin  is a canton situated in the department of the Pas-de-Calais and in the Hauts-de-France region of northern France.

Geography 
The canton is organised around Carvin in the arrondissement of Lens. The elevation varies from 17m to 42m (Carvin) for an average elevation of 25m.

Composition
At the French canton reorganisation which came into effect in March 2015, the canton was expanded from 2 to 3 communes:
Carvin
Courrières
Libercourt

Population

See also
Cantons of Pas-de-Calais 
Communes of Pas-de-Calais 
Arrondissements of the Pas-de-Calais department

References

Cantons of Pas-de-Calais